A super-twisted nematic (STN) display is a type of monochrome passive-matrix liquid crystal display (LCD).

History 

This type of LCD was invented at the Brown Boveri Research Center, Baden, Switzerland, in 1983. For years a better scheme for multiplexing was sought. Standard twisted nematic (TN) LCDs with a 90 degrees twisted structure of the molecules have a contrast vs. voltage characteristic unfavorable for passive-matrix addressing as there is no distinct threshold voltage. STN displays, with the molecules twisted from 180 to 270 degrees, have superior characteristics.

Features 

The main advantage of STN LCDs is their more pronounced electro-optical threshold allowing for passive-matrix addressing with many more lines and columns. For the first time, a prototype STN matrix display with 540x270 pixels was made by Brown Boveri (today ABB) in 1984, which was considered a breakthrough for the industry.

STN LCDs require less power and are less expensive to manufacture than TFT LCDs, another popular type of LCD that has largely superseded STN for mainstream laptops. STN displays typically suffer from lower image quality and slower response time than TFT displays. However, STN LCDs can be made purely reflective for viewing under direct sunlight. STN displays are used in some inexpensive mobile phones and informational screens of some digital products. In the early 1990s, they had been used in some portable computers such as Amstrad's PPC512 and PPC640, and in Nintendo's Game Boy.

Variants 

CSTN (color super-twist nematic) is a color form for electronic display screens originally developed by Sharp Electronics. The CSTN uses red, green and blue filters to display color. The original CSTN displays developed in the early 1990s suffered from slow response times and ghosting (where text or graphic changes are blurred because the pixels cannot turn off and on fast enough). Recent advances in the technology, however, have made CSTN a viable alternative to active matrix displays. New CSTN displays offer 100ms response times (for comparison TFT displays offer 8ms or less), a 140 degree viewing angle and high-quality color rivaling TFT displays – all at about half the cost. A newer passive-matrix technology called High-Performance Addressing (HPA) offers even better response times and contrast than CSTN.

Samsung had two proprietary technologies for STN LCDs, Ultra Fine & Bright (UFB), which delivered wide viewing angle (about 120 degrees), faster response time (about 60 ms) and less power consumption, while Ultra Fine & High Speed (UFS), delivered almost same color depths as TFT LCDs, greater color purity, much faster response time (about 14 ms) and same contrast ratio as TFT LCDs.

Other STN displays include:

 Double layer STN: An earlier passive matrix LCD technology that used an extra compensating layer to provide a sharper image.
 DSTN: An enhanced STN passive matrix LCD. The screen is divided into halves, and each half is scanned simultaneously, thereby doubling the number of lines refreshed per second and providing a sharper appearance. DSTN was widely used on earlier laptops. See STN and LCD.
 FRSTN: Fast Response STN
 FSTN: Film compensated STN, Formulated STN or Filtered STN. A passive matrix LCD technology that uses a film compensating layer between the STN display and rear polarizer for added sharpness and contrast. It was used in laptops before the DSTN method became popular and many early 21st Century cellphones.
 FFSTN: Double film super-twist nematic
 MSTN: Monochrome super-twist nematic
 CCSTN: Color Coded Super Twist Nematic. An LCD capable of displaying a limited range of colours, used in some digital organisers and graphic calculators in the 1990s

References

External links 

 Display Types and Technologies

Display technology
Swiss inventions